The following lists events that happened during 1971 in Uganda.

Incumbents
President: Milton Obote (until January 25), Idi Amin (starting January 25)
Vice President: John Babiiha (until January), vacant (starting January)

Events

January
 January 25 - Idi Amin deposes Milton Obote in a coup, and becomes President.

References

 
1970s in Uganda
Years of the 20th century in Uganda
Uganda
Uganda